St. John the Baptist Roman Catholic Church and Rectory is a historic Roman Catholic church and rectory located at 20 Broad Street in Plattsburgh, Clinton County, New York. Both structures were added to the National Register of Historic Places as one record in 1982.

Description
The imposing masonry church was built in 1874. Cruciform in plan with Gothic Revival pointed arches and buttresses.  It features a spired tower surmounted by a stone cross finial.

The rectory was built between 1909–1910 and is a three-story, rectangular-in-plan masonry structure that features a half-mansard roof with balcony. The rectory has an unusual combination of Colonial Revival and Gothic Revival features.

References

External links

Church of St. John the Baptist website

Roman Catholic churches in New York (state)
Churches on the National Register of Historic Places in New York (state)
Gothic Revival church buildings in New York (state)
Roman Catholic churches completed in 1874
19th-century Roman Catholic church buildings in the United States

Colonial Revival architecture in New York (state)
Churches in Clinton County, New York
National Register of Historic Places in Clinton County, New York
Roman Catholic Diocese of Ogdensburg